Kansas City USD 500, also known as Kansas City Kansas Public Schools, is a public unified school district headquartered in Kansas City, Kansas, United States.  As of 2021, it has approximately 23,690 students enrolled in the district in grades PreK & K-12. The district currently operates 5 high schools, 7 middle schools, and 29 elementary schools and 4 alternative schools. The district has a number of additional educational and support facilities.

Board of Education
The board of education has 7 members.  Also, it controls the Kansas City, Kansas Public Library.

Schools

High schools:
 J. C. Harmon High School
 F. L. Schlagle High School
 Washington High School
 Wyandotte High School

Grades 8-12:
 Sumner Academy of Arts & Science

Middle Schools
 Argentine 
 Arrowhead
 Carl B. Bruce 
 Central
 Eisenhower
 Rosedale 
 Gloria Willis

Elementary Schools
 Banneker
 Bertram Caruthers (Previously Hawthorne)
 Lowell Brune
 Central
 Douglass
 T. A. Edison
 Emerson
 John Fiske
 Grant
 Hazel Grove
 Claude Huyck
 John F. Kennedy
 Lindbergh
 McKinley
 New Chelsea
 New Stanley
 Noble Prentis
 M. E. Pearson
 Quindaro
 Frank Rushton
 Silver City
 Stony Point North
 Stony Point South
 Mark Twain
 Eugene Ware
 Welborn
 West Park
 Whittier
 Frances Willard

Preschools
 KCK Early Childhood Center
 Earl Watson, Jr. Early Childhood Center
 Morse Early Childhood Center
 North Central Office Early Childhood Center

Alternative
 Bridges Wyandotte Academy
 Fairfax Learning Center
 Juvenile Services Center
 KVC Academy

See also
 Kansas State Department of Education
 Kansas State High School Activities Association
 List of high schools in Kansas
 List of unified school districts in Kansas

References

External links
 

School districts in Kansas
Education in Kansas City, Kansas
Education in Wyandotte County, Kansas